Our Love is the 26th CD by the Cantopop duo Twins and is their third greatest hits album.
The album was released in February 2007 to celebrate 6 years since the group formed. It consists of 3 discs; a total of 52 songs, most of which were chart-topping hits.

First SPECIAL EDITION was only limited produced 2000 sets, and comes with:

Oversize photo book (15 inch x 20 inch)
Twins collector's stamp set (can be used in Hong Kong)
Individual printed code for each album

Second version included:

Exclusive DVD featuring 小心愛 MV,紅噹噹飛吻 MV and behind-the-scenes material with The Grasshoppers
Twins x Grasshoppers - Chinese New Year goodies
Twins Photo Book
Limited Edition Handphone strip

Third version comes with an extra DVD that contained: 
 相愛6年 MV
 飄零燕 MV
 小心愛 MV
 紅噹噹飛吻 MV - 草蜢合唱
 紅噹噹飛吻 MV 製作花絮 - 草蜢合唱

CD content

Disc one
 相愛6年 (NEW) (6 Years Love) (新歌)(Twins 6週年主題曲)
 你不是好情人 (You're Not a Good Lover) (solo) (蔡卓妍 獨唱)
 非君不嫁 (Don't Marry a Bad Guy) (solo) (鍾欣桐 獨唱)
 八十塊環遊世界 (Around the World with 80 Dollars)
 見習愛神 (Trainee Cupid)
 死性不改 (Hard to Change) (with Boy'z)
 下一站天后 (Next Station, Tian Hou)
 戀愛大過天 (Love Is Bigger Than Sky)
 女校男生 (Girls' School Male Student)
 多謝失戀 (Thank You for the Break-up)
 眼紅紅 (Red Eyes)
 我們的紀念冊 (Our Souvenir)
 梨渦淺笑 (Dimple Smiley)
 千金 (Thousand Gold)
 大浪漫主義 (Big Romantic Idea)
 亂世佳人 (Beauty in the Chaotic World)
 朋友的愛 (Friend's Love)
 星光遊樂園 (Starlight Amusement)

Disc two
 飄零燕 (Lonely Swallow) (新歌)
 天下有雙 (Dual World) ("雙子神偷" 電影主題曲)
 我決定走了 (I Decided to Leave)
 你不是好情人 (You're Not a Good Lover)
 雙失情人節 (Double Loss on Valentine Day)
 幼稚園 (Kindergarten)
 丟架 (Disgrace)
 救生圈 (Lifesaver)
 飲歌 (Drinking Song)
 狂想曲 (Rhapsody)
 黑色喜劇 (Black Comedy)
 海底深 (Deep Sea)
 精選 (Best Choice)
 冬令時間 (Winter Time)
 18變 (18 Changes)
 德州的故事 (Texas Story)
 夏雨 (Summer Rain)
 我很想愛他 (I Really Want to Love Him)

Disc three
 小心愛 (Be Careful of Love) (新歌)
 紅噹噹飛吻 (Red Flying Kiss) (新歌) - 草蜢合唱
 桃紅結他 (Pink Guitar)
 士多啤梨蘋果橙 (Strawberry, Apple, Orange)
 女人味 (Girl Power)
 熱浪假期 (Hot Vacation)
 一時無兩 (One Time No Two)
 明愛暗戀補習社 (Opening Love & Secret Love in Tutoring Class)
 魚蛋歌 (The Fishball Song)
 女仔歌 (The Girl Song)
 星星月亮太陽 (The Stars, The Moon & The Sun)
 愛情當入樽 (Slam Dunk Love)
 二人世界盃 (World Cup of 2 People)
 大紅大紫 (Big Red Big Purple)
 零4好玩 ('04 Is Very Fun)
 ICHIBAN興奮 (Ichiban Exciting)
 夏日狂嘩 (Exciting Summer)
 森巴皇后 (Samba Queen)

2007 compilation albums
Twins (group) compilation albums
2007 video albums
Music video compilation albums
Twins (group) video albums